Dithalama cosmospila is a species of moth of the family Geometridae first described by Edward Meyrick in 1888. It is found in Australia.

References

Moths described in 1888
Scopulini